The following is a list of dynasties, states or empires which are Turkic-speaking, of Turkic origins, or both. There are currently six recognised Turkic sovereign states. Additionally, there are six federal subjects of Russia in which a Turkic language is a majority, and five where Turkic languages are the minority, and also Crimea, a disputed territory between Ukraine and Russia where Turkic languages are the indigenous minority. There have been numerous Turkic confederations, dynasties, and empires throughout history across Eurasia and North Africa.

Contemporary entities with at least one Turkic language recognised as official

Current independent states

De facto states 
Recognised only by Turkey.

Federal subjects (Republics) of Russia

Autonomous regions

Historical Turkic confederations, dynasties, and states

Tribal confederations

Royal clans 
 Ashina (First Turkic Khaganate, Western Turkic Khaganate, Eastern Turkic Khaganate, Khazars, Nushibi, Second Turkic Khaganate)
 Ashide (Empress clan of Second Turkic Khaganate)
 Yaglakar (Uyghur Khaganate, Ganzhou Uyghur Kingdom)
 Ädiz (Uyghur Khaganate)
 Dulo clan (Volga Bulgaria)
 Bulanid (Khazars)
 House of Aba
 House of Basarab
 Osman (Ottoman Empire)
 Bahri (Mamluk Sultanate)
 Sarkar (Shirvan Khanate)
 Javanshir (Karabakh Khanate)
 Terterids (Second Bulgarian Empire)
 House of Shishman
 House of Seljuq (Seljuk Empire, Sultanate of Rum, Kerman Seljuk Sultanate)

Central Asia

Europe

Middle East and North Africa

Maghreb region

Indian subcontinent

Sinicized Turkic dynasties 
The Shatuo Turks founded several sinicized dynasties in northern China during the Five Dynasties and Ten Kingdoms period. The official language of these dynasties was Chinese and they used Chinese titles and names.

Turko-Persian states 

The Turco-Persian tradition was an Islamic tradition of the interpretation of literary forms, practiced and patronized by Turkic rulers and speakers. Many Turko-Persian states were founded in modern-day Eastern Turkey, Iran, Iraq, Turkmenistan and Uzbekistan.

Turco-Mongol states 
Turco-Mongol is a term describing the synthesis of Mongol and Turkic cultures by several states of Mongol origin throughout Eurasia. These states adopted Turkic languages, either among the populace or among the elite, and converted to Islam, but retained Mongol political and legal institutions.

Vassal khanates 
The following list is only of vassal khanates of Turkic origin, which were ruled by of another descent peoples.

Former Provisional Governments and Republics

Soviet Republics

Autonomous Soviet Republics

Autonomous oblasts of the Soviet Union

See also 
Comparison of the Turkic states
Turkic peoples
Turkic migration
Turkic tribal confederations
Timeline of the Turkic peoples (500–1300)
Turkification
Turkic settlement of the Tarim Basin
Turco-Mongol tradition
Turco-Persian tradition
Nomadic empire
Eurasian nomads

References

Further reading 
Finkel, Caroline, "Osman's Dream, History of the Ottoman Empire 1300–1923", 2005, John Murray 
Findley, C.V., The Turks in World History, 2005, Oxford University Press. 
Forbes Manz, B., The Rise and Rule of Tamerlane, 2002, Cambridge University Press. 
Hupchick, D.P., The Balkans: From Constantinople to Communism, 2002, Palgrave Macmillan. 
Lewis, Bernard. "Istanbul and the Civilization of the Ottoman Empire", 1963, University of Oklahoma Press. .
Saunders, J.J., The History of the Mongol Conquests, 2001, Routledge & Kegan Ltd. 
Thackston, W.M., The Baburnama: Memoirs of Babur, Prince and Emperor, 2002, Modern Library. 
Vásáry, I., Cumans and Tatars: Oriental Military in the Pre-Ottoman Balkans, 1185–1365, 2005, Cambridge University Press. 

Lists of former countries
Lists of dynasties
Eurasia
Country classifications